Ancylosis costistrigella is a species of snout moth in the genus Ancylosis. It was described by Ragonot, in 1890, and is known from the Canary Islands., Algeria, Tunisia, Morocco, Israel, Iran, Afghanistan, Bahrain, the United Arab Emirates and Sudan.

The larvae feed on Salvia aegyptiaca.

References

Moths described in 1890
costistrigella
Moths of Africa
Moths of Asia